Glenn McGrath is a 2009 statue by artist Brett "Mon" Garling. The work is installed in Tom Perry Park in Narromine, a town in the Orana region of New South Wales, Australia. The statue commemorates former Australian Test cricketer, Glenn McGrath. McGrath grew up in Narromine where he first played cricket. He holds the world record for the highest number of Test wickets by a fast bowler and is fourth on the all-time list.

The statue was commissioned by Narromine Shire Council at a cost of $70,000. The statue was unveiled on 6 June 2009 in the presence of both McGrath and Premier of New South Wales Nathan Rees.

References

External links

Statues of sportspeople
Statues in Australia
2009 in Australia
Bronze sculptures in Australia
Cricket culture
Cultural depictions of cricketers
Cultural depictions of Australian men